The Studebaker Coupe Express was a passenger car based pickup truck, produced by the Studebaker Corporation of South Bend, Indiana, between 1937 and 1939. Unlike other concurrent pick-up trucks, the coupe express mated Studebaker's passenger car styling to a full size truck bed.

The Coupe Express utilized the Dictator passenger car frame, running gear, and front sheet metal. A new body stamping was made to form the cab back. An all-steel pickup box was built for the pickup models. The model was sold as a cab and chassis, with rear fenders attached, so a service box could be fabricated by the end user (such as a plumber, or depot hack).

The truck was powered by the larger of Studebaker's L-head six-cylinder flathead engines and mated to a 3-speed manual transmission. Studebaker offered a Borg-Warner 3-speed transmission with overdrive as an option. Other options included, a radio, heater, wire reinforced sliding back window and turn indicators. Two wheel options were available including a stamped steel disc wheel and a stamped steel 'artillery' spoked wheel.

Production for the 1937 model year was approximately 3,000 units.

The truck's passenger cab was restyled in 1938 to reflect the modernized passenger car sheet metal resulted a slightly longer pickup bed. Production for 1938 was approximately 1,200 units.

The 1939 model was again remodeled to reflect Studebaker's annual design updates. Production was approximately 1,000 units. The Coupe Express model was discontinued after the 1939 model year, and Studebaker did not offer a successor model for 1940.

Studebaker introduced the M-Series pickup truck 1941, while the company used the Coupe Express name in advertising for a time, but no M-Series trucks were ever officially designated as the Coupe Express.

Coupe Express
Pickup trucks
Rear-wheel-drive vehicles
1930s cars
Motor vehicles manufactured in the United States